is a Japanese gravure idol of Spanish, Austrian, Chinese, Japanese and Filipino descent who debuted in 2010. Otake and her family were featured in a Fuji TV documentary, The Non-fiction, on the difficulties of becoming an idol.

DVD
 Pre-pre-pudding! (May 20, 2009)
 New Kiss (August 27, 2010)
 Whipped Cream (November 26, 2010)
 Crazy for You (February 25, 2011)
 Aiko Graduation Trip Diary Angel Kiss (February 22, 2012)
 Aishū Cinema (June 20, 2012)

Television
 The Non-fiction (Fuji TV, May 20, 2012)

References

External links
 Official blog (Ameba) 
 Official blog (Gree) 

Japanese gravure idols
Japanese people of Austrian descent
Japanese people of Chinese descent
Japanese people of Filipino descent
Japanese people of Spanish descent
1994 births
Living people